Corse-Matin is a French-language daily local newspaper published in Ajaccio, Corsica, France.

History and profile
Corse-Matin was part of Lagardère Group through its subsidiary Groupe Hachette until August 2007 when it was sold to Hersant Media Group. The paper is owned by Nice-Matin Group. In December 2012 French businessman Bernard Tapie bought a share in the daily. The headquarters of the paper is in Ajaccio.

The sister newspapers of Corse-Matin are Nice-Matin, Monaco-Matin and Var-Matin. In 1998 another local daily of the island, La Corse, merged with Corse-Matin.

Corse-Matin has been subject to terrorist attacks. Its headquarters was attacked by unknown people in 1992, 1994 and 1997. In May 2011 the office of the paper in Bastia was also attacked.

In 2020 the circulation of Corse-Matin was 25,906 copies.

References

External links
 

1944 establishments in France
Daily newspapers published in France
Mass media in Ajaccio
Publications established in 1944